Richard D. Dean (born May 27, 1929) is a retired United States Army brigadier general who served as Deputy Director of the Army National Guard.

Early life
Richard Daniel Dean was born in Sedalia, Missouri, on May 27, 1929.

He joined the Missouri Army National Guard’s 175th Military Police Battalion in 1948.  Dean completed the Reserve Officer Training Corps program at the University of Missouri in 1952, and received a Bachelor of Science degree in civil engineering and business.

Dean became the owner and operator of a construction company in Sedalia.

Korean War
Commissioned a second lieutenant of Field Artillery, after completing his initial training Dean served in the Korean War.  Assigned to the 160th Field Artillery, a unit of the 45th Infantry Division, Dean served in Battery C as a Forward Observer, and later in a staff assignment as Assistant Troop Information and Education Officer.  He was released from active duty in March 1954.

Post-Korean War
Dean rejoined the Missouri Army National Guard, and advanced through command and staff assignments of increasing rank and responsibility.  He commanded Battery C, 1st Battalion, 128th Field Artillery and Headquarters Battery, 2nd Battalion, 128th Field Artillery in the 1950s.  He later commanded the 1st Battalion, 128th Field Artillery.

Later career
In 1975, Dean was assigned as commander of the 135th Field Artillery Group.

In 1979, he was appointed to command the 35th Engineer Brigade.

Dean was appointed Deputy Director of the Army National Guard in 1983 and promoted to brigadier general.  He served in this position until his retirement in 1987.

Military education
Dean is a graduate of the United States Army Command and General Staff College and the National War College.

Awards
Dean's awards include:

Meritorious Service Medal
Army Commendation Medal
National Defense Service Medal
Korean Service Medal with Service star
Armed Forces Reserve Medal with gold hourglass
Army Reserve Component Achievement Medal with oak leaf cluster
Army Service Ribbon
United Nations Service Medal
Republic of Korea Presidential Unit Citation
Missouri Conspicuous Service Medal
Missouri Commendation Ribbon
Missouri Long Service Ribbon 
Missouri State Emergency Duty Ribbon

Post-military activities

After retiring, Dean resided in Arlington, Virginia and Sedalia.

In 2009, Dean was one of the signers of a letter to President Barack Obama, in which more than 400 retired generals and admirals asked that the 1993 Don't ask, don't tell policy on homosexuality among members of the military be kept in place.

References

1929 births
Living people
United States Army generals
United States Army personnel of the Korean War
People from Sedalia, Missouri
University of Missouri alumni
United States Army Command and General Staff College alumni
National War College alumni